An interim is a period of temporary pause or change in a sequence of events, or a temporary state, and is often applied to transitional political entities.

Interim may also refer to:

Temporary organizational arrangements (general concept)
Provisional government, emergency government during the creation, collapse, or crisis of a state; also called interim government
Caretaker government, temporary rule between governments in a parliamentary democracy; also called interim government
Acting president, interim head of a state
Acting (law), designation of a person temporarily exercising the authority of any position
Interrex
Interim management, in business

Specific temporary political arrangements

Provisional and interim governments and constitutions
Articles of Confederation, United States 1781–1788
Interim government of California, 1846–1850
Provisional Constitution of the Confederate States, 1861–1862
Provisional Constitution of the Republic of China, 1912–1931
Dáil Constitution, Ireland 1918–1921
Interim National Assembly (Czechoslovakia), 1945–1946
Interim Government of India, 1946–1947
Provisional Constitution of 1950, Indonesia 1950–1959
Interim Constitution of Tanzania, 1964–1977
Interim presidency of Suharto, Indonesia 1967–1968
Interim Constitution of Azad Jammu and Kashmir (1974), from 1974
Interim Batasang Pambansa, government of the Philippines 1978–1984
Interim Government of Iran 1979–80, also covered by Interim Government of Iran (1979–80), 
Interim Government of Iran (1981)
Interim Parliament of the Turkish Republic of Northern Cyprus, 1983
Transitional Government of Ethiopia, 1991–1995
Interim Government of Somalia, 1991–1996
Interim National Government, Nigeria 1993
Interim Constitution (South Africa), 1994–1997
National Transitional Council (Congo), 1997–2001
Joint Interim Administrative Structure, Kosovo 2000–2001
Afghan Interim Administration, 2001–2002
Law of Administration for the State of Iraq for the Transitional Period, 2004–2005
Iraqi Interim Government, 2005
Iraqi Transitional Government, 2005–2006
Interim National Constitution of the Republic of Sudan, 2005
2006 interim constitution of Thailand and 2006 Thai interim civilian government
Interim Cabinet of Fiji, 2007
2011 Provisional Constitution of Egypt, 2011–2012
National Transitional Council, Libya 2011–2012
Libyan interim Constitutional Declaration, from 2011
Regmi interim cabinet, Nepal 2013–2014
Interim Government of Ambazonia, from 2017
2020 interim government of Kyrgyzstan

Caretaker interim governments

Specific states generally
Caretaker government of Australia, laws and history pertaining to interim governments in that country
Caretaker government of Bangladesh, laws and history pertaining to interim governments in that country
Caretaker government of Malaysia, laws and history pertaining to interim governments in that country
Caretaker Prime Minister of Pakistan, laws and history pertaining to interim governments in that country
Interim and Acting President of Israel

Specific caretaker interim governments
Churchill caretaker ministry, United Kingdom 1945
Iraqi Governing Council, government under the Law of Administration for the State of Iraq for the Transitional Period, 2004–2005 (see above)
Interim legislature of Nepal, from 2009
Interim Cabinet of Panagiotis Pikrammenos in Greece, 2012
2015 interim election government of Turkey
Caretaker Government of Myanmar (2021), from 2021
Sub-state entities
Interim East Punjab Assembly, 1947–1951
Interim Morgan Government, Wales 2000
Interim Uttarakhand Assembly, Indian state of Uttarakhand 2000–2002
Ituri Interim Administration, government of the Ituri region of the Congo, from 2003
Syrian Interim Government, government of some parts of Syria from 2013
Bangsamoro Interim Cabinet, government of Bangsamoro in the Philippines from 2018

Temporary peaces
Regensburg Interim, 1542 decree relating to religious disputes in Germany
Augsburg Interim, 1548 decree relating to religious disputes in Germany
Leipzig Interim, another 1548 decree relating to religious disputes in Germany
Interim Peace between Finland and the USSR 1940–1941

Diplomacy
Chargé d'affaires ad interim, temporary head of a diplomatic mission
Interim Meeting of Foreign Ministers, 1945, also called the Moscow Conference of Foreign Ministers
Interim Agreement, commonly known as the Oslo Accords, relating to the Israeli–Palestinian conflict
Interim Agreement on the West Bank and the Gaza Strip, commonly known as the Oslo II Accord
Sinai Interim Agreement, also known as the Sinai II Agreement, between Egypt and Israel 1975 
Interim Self Governing Authority, 2003 Tamil proposal
Geneva interim agreement on Iranian nuclear program, 2013, commonly known as the Joint Plan of Action

Other
Interim Committee, precursor to the American Atomic Energy Commission 1945–1946
Interim Independent Electoral Commission (Kenya), 2009–2011
Interim leader (Canada), a temporary party leader appointed upon the resignation or death of a party leader
Interim Committee on Un-American Activities, commonly known as the Canwell Committee, legislative committee of Washington State in the United States, 1947–1949
Nassau Interim Finance Authority, from 2000, New York State commission
Interim Climate Change Committee, New Zealand 2018–2019

Legal concepts and procedures
Interim order, court order in effect pending outcome of a case
Interim trustee, concept in United States bankruptcy law
Interim appeal, a partial appeal in United States law
Interim interdict in Scots law, a temporary injunction 
Judicial interim release, part of Canadian bail law

Peacekeeping forces
United Nations Interim Force in Lebanon, from 1978
United Nations Interim Security Force for Abyei in Sudan, from 2011

Sports
Caretaker manager, temporary manager of a soccer team; also called interim manager
Interim championship, temporary world championship in boxing and other contact sports
IFA Interim Intermediate League, Ireland 2008–2009

The arts
Interim (film), 1953 short film by Stan Brakhage
Interim (album), 2004 album by British rock band The Fall
Interim Resurgence, 1985 album by Zoogz Rift
INTERIM-Theater in Munich

Other
Interim analysis, in science, analysis of incomplete data
Interim state, in some religious thought, an intermediate state between one's death and the End Times
Interim alternative educational setting, in American education, temporary placement for a special-needs student
Interim Housing, in China, provision for temporarily displaced persons
MCC Interim Linux, provisional software release 1992
Institute of Interim Management, United Kingdom
Interim Fast Attack Vehicle, American scout vehicle
Interim Control Module, NASA machine 
Interim Capability for Airborne Networking, United States Air Force process
Interim Register of Marine and Nonmarine Genera, taxonomic database
Interim Biogeographic Regionalisation for Australia

See also
Ad interim, Latin phrase for "in the meantime"
Interim velim a sole mihi non obstes ("In the meantime, don't block my sun")
Regent, temporary ruler standing in for monarch currently unable to exercise rule
Locum tenens, a person who temporarily fulfills the duties of another